Threemile Creek is a stream in Renville County, in the U.S. state of Minnesota. It is a tributary of the Minnesota River.

Threemile Creek was so named from its distance,  from Fort Ridgely.

See also
List of rivers of Minnesota

References

Rivers of Brown County, Minnesota
Rivers of Renville County, Minnesota
Rivers of Minnesota